The 1938 All England Championships was a badminton tournament held at the Royal Horticultural Halls, Westminster, England from February 28 to March 6, 1938.

Final results

Results

Men's singles

Women's singles

References

All England Open Badminton Championships
All England
All England Open Badminton Championships in London
1938 in badminton
February 1938 sports events
March 1938 sports events
1938 in London